Joshua Sason is an American entrepreneur, investor, and entertainment producer. He is the founder and chief executive officer of Magna, a global investment firm based in New York City.

Overview 
Sason founded Magna, a New York-based investment firm, in 2009. The firm now operates three investment platforms – Magna Equities, Magna Ventures, and Magna Entertainment – focused on direct investments into public companies, private ventures, and entertainment productions and businesses, respectively. According to its website, the firm has invested more than $200 million in public equities since its inception in 2009. 

Sason is a benefactor to community organizations near Long Island, New York. On June 16, 2014, Sason was honored at the Mid-Island Y Jewish Community Center's 13th Annual Golf Outing at Glen Head Country Club in Glen Head, New York. Sason is the executive producer of three feature films. His most recent production was The 50 Year Argument, a feature documentary co-directed by Martin Scorsese. Sason is the executive producer of Bleed for This, a film based on the true story of world-champion boxer Vinny Pazienza, which began production in November 2014.

Filmography

References 

American chief executives of financial services companies
American investors
Businesspeople from New York (state)
Living people
Year of birth missing (living people)